= Mirabi (music) =

Mirabi is a musical art form that was developed in South Africa in the middle 1950s.

== History ==
It is often characterized as music indigenous of the South African region mixed with American big band jazz. Mirabi music is often thought to have been created as a social protest against South Africa's Apartheid. Mirabi was just one part of black South African culture that created conflict between Apartheid officials and the black community. A good example of this sentiment can be seen in a song called "Sip n' Fly". Written by musician Ntemi Piliso, considered one of several founders of Mirabi, the song is a humorous song that talks about how to sneak alcohol past the Apartheid police.
